Ismail Jussa Ladhu (born 18 August 1971) is a Zanzibari ACT Wazalendo politician serving the Stonetown constituency in the Zanzibar House of Representatives. He also served as a member of the Tanzanian Parliament in 2010 after being nominated by President Jakaya Kikwete.

References

External links

1971 births
Living people
Alliance for Change and Transparency politicians
Members of the Zanzibar House of Representatives
Tanzanian MPs 2005–2010
Lumumba Secondary School alumni
Alumni of the University of Hull
Tanzanian Muslims
Tanzanian politicians of Indian descent